The Chief of the Kalinago Territory presides over the Kalinago Council, the local government of the Kalinago Territory (formerly known as the Carib Territory or Carib Reserve). The position is the equivalent of a village council chairperson elsewhere in Dominica.  Beginning in the late 20th century, Kalinago Chiefs have also acted as a representative of the Kalinago Territory to other indigenous populations in the Caribbean region, and have worked with organizations including the Caribbean Organization of Indigenous Peoples and the United Nations Working Group on Indigenous Populations.

Historically, the Chief was the leader of the Kalinago, the indigenous inhabitants of Dominica.  Under British colonialism, the title was officially recognized as a ceremonial position beginning in 1903, when the Carib Reserve was established.  The colonial governor endowed the Carib Chief with a silver-headed staff and a sash embroidered with "The Chief of the Caribs" in gothic lettering.  Colonial authorities suspended the position in 1930 after "The Carib War," a brief, but violent, civil disturbance.  The position of Chief was finally reinstated in 1953, as part of an island-wide system of local council government.  The territory name was changed from "Carib Reserve" to "Kalinago Territory" by an act of the House of Assembly in 2015.

List 
Sources:

Notes

References
World Statesmen.org
.
.
.

Carib people
Government of Dominica
Indigenous leaders of the Americas
Indigenous peoples in Dominica
Indigenous topics of the Caribbean
Lists of political office-holders in Dominica